The 1962–63 season was Manchester United's 61st season in the Football League, and their 18th consecutive season in the top division of English football. They finished a disappointing 19th in the league, narrowly avoiding relegation, but also finished the season as FA Cup winners with a 3–1 win over Leicester City in the final. It was a successful first season at the club for record signing Denis Law, who scored 23 goals in the league and 29 in all competitions. The FA Cup win was United's first major trophy for six years and the first trophy they had won since the Munich air disaster.

First Division

FA Cup

Squad statistics

References

Manchester United F.C. seasons
Manchester United